Anđelina Radić (Serbian Cyrillic: Анђелина Радић, born 18 November 1994 in Loznica, FR Yugoslavia) is a Serbian professional basketball player. She currently plays for Polish team SKK Polonia Warszawa.

Honours
ŽKK Vršac 
 National Cup of Serbia (1): 2011–12

ŽKK Vojvodina 
 National Cup of Serbia (1): 2014–15

References

External links
 Profile at eurobasket.com

1994 births
Living people
Serbian women's basketball players
Sportspeople from Loznica
Power forwards (basketball)
Small forwards
ŽKK Vršac players
ŽKK Partizan players
ŽKK Vojvodina players